Live-set refers to any performance of electronic music that is generated live out of a bank of equipment or a laptop rather than a DJ mix, which is played from a pre-recorded medium, such as vinyl and CD with turntables or audio files with DJ software such as Traktor, Serato or VirtualDJ.

In some cases, advanced DJ mixes can include live-set elements, e.g. Traktor's remix decks, cue juggling, live re-sampling, etc. 

Electronic music live-sets can also include live electronic instruments and singing.

Notable performers of live-sets
The Chemical Brothers
The Prodigy
Underworld
Orbital
Aphex Twin
Amon Tobin
Tim Exile
Bonobo
Fatboy Slim
Pendulum
Disclosure
GRiZ
Arnaud Rebotini
ATMA
Squarepusher
The Flashbulb
Alva Noto
Peaches
Gesaffelstein
Apparat
Groove Armada
Basement Jaxx
Thievery Corporation
Infected Mushroom
Shpongle
Moby
Netsky
deadmau5
Daft Punk
Justice
Digitalism
Chase and Status
Porter Robinson
Madeon
The Chainsmokers
Flume
Autechre

See also
Live electronic music

Music performance